The Maiden Way or Maidenway (Middle English: Maydengathe) was a roughly  Roman road in northern Britain connecting the Roman fort of  Bravoniacum (Kirkby Thore) near Penrith with that of Magnae (Carvoran) on Hadrian's Wall, via the intermediate fort of Epiacum (also known as Whitley Castle) roughly half-way between the two.

In 2016, it was reported that investigations using LIDAR technology by the Environment agency for the purposes of flood mapping and other environmental management were providing extensive data showing the existence of underground archaeological features including Roman roads. This included a continuation of the Maiden Way southwards from Kirkby Thore to the Roman fort at Low Borrowbridge near Tebay.

Bravoniacum was a waypoint on the northern leg of the Roman road connecting Luguvalium (Carlisle) with Eboracum (York) and points south. Magnae was one of the waypoints on the Stanegate beside Hadrian's Wall. As such, the Maiden Way served as a shortcut for supplying the central and eastern areas of the Wall. It also provided supplies to the lead and silver mines near Epiacum (Whitley Castle).

Following the end of Roman rule in Britain, the Maiden Way was used as a drovers' road. The route was probably named after the Maiden Castle fortlet guarding the Stainmore Pass to the east of the fort of Verterae (Brough).

The Pennine Way footpath follows the line of the Maiden Way for several miles on a roughly north-south route across Lambley Common in Northumberland, above the west bank of the river South Tyne. Immediately north of this stretch, a modern minor road follows the line of the Maiden Way for several miles to the west of Featherstone Castle.

See also
 Roman roads in Britain

References

External links
 
 .
 .

Roman roads in England
Roads in Cumbria
Roman sites in Cumbria